Oxney may refer to:

Isle of Oxney
William Oxney (disambiguation)